Pilnyeo (lit. A Needed Woman) is a South Korean melodrama film directed by Jeong So-yeong in 1970.

Plot
Twice widowed, Pilnyeo vows never to marry again and takes a job at a coal mine. One day she is raped by her supervisor, but later marries him. Pilnyeo continues to be abused by her new husband, but later risks her own life for him.

Awards
1971 7th Baeksang Arts Awards
 Best Director - Jeong So-yeong
 Best Producer - Jeong So-yeong
 Best New Actress - Kim Yun-jeong
 Technical Award - Son In-ho

1971 14th Buil Film Awards
 Best Actor - Namkoong Won

1971 8th Blue Dragon Film Awards
 Best Screenplay - Kim Soo-hyun

References

External links
 
 

South Korean drama films
1970s Korean-language films
1970 films
1970 drama films
Works by Kim Soo-hyun (writer)